Hypodoxa multicolor is a moth of the family Geometridae first described by William Warren in 1899. It is found in Australia and New Guinea.

References

Moths described in 1899
Pseudoterpnini